Results of India national football team from 2010-2019.

2010

2011

2012

2013

2014

2015

2016

2017

2018

2019

See also
Indian women's national football team results (2010–2019)
Unofficial games of India in 2010s
India national football team results (2000–2009)
India national football team results (2020–present)

References

2010
Football